Kisei may refer to:

Kisei (shogi), a title in shogi
Kisei (go), a title and competition in Go
Kisei, Mie, a former town in Watarai District, Mie, Japan
Kisei (North Korean village), a North Korean village in the Demilitarized Zone on the Korean Peninsula